The Dove is a 1927 American silent romantic drama film directed by Roland West based on a 1925 Broadway play by Willard Mack and starring Norma Talmadge, Noah Beery, and Gilbert Roland.

Background
The original story is about Mexican despot Don José (Beery), who falls in love with the dancing girl Dolores (Talmadge) who rejects him. Due to the potential political repercussions of condemning Mexico, it was decided to relocate the plot to some anonymous Mediterranean country. The film was Norma Talmadge's first feature for United Artists.

Plot
A despot falls for a dancing girl. After she rejects him, she has her other beau framed for murder.

Cast
 Norma Talmadge as Dolores
 Noah Beery as Don José María y Sandoval
 Gilbert Roland as Johnny Powell
 Eddie Borden as Billy
 Harry Myers as Mike
 Walter Daniels as The Drunk
 Kalla Pasha as The Comandante
 Michael Vavitch as Gómez
 Brinsley Shaw as The Patriot
 Charles Darvas as The Comandante's Captain
 Michael Dark as Sandoval's Captain
 Olga Baclanova as Bit Part (uncredited)
 Robert Gleckler as Bit Part (uncredited)
 Mark Hamilton as Prisoner (uncredited)
 Andy MacLennan as Bit Part (uncredited)
 Jack McDonald as Bit Part (uncredited)
 Alice White as Bit Part (uncredited)

Recognition
Though the film was not well received, William Cameron Menzies won the first Academy Award for Best Art Direction in 1928 for this film and Tempest, though the award was then called "Interior Decoration."
At the Library of Congress are reels 1, 3, 4, and 8. The film is missing reels 2, 5, 6, 7, and 9.

In 1932, Herbert Brenon directed a new talkie version named Girl of the Rio, starred by Dolores del Río for RKO Radio Pictures.

Awards and nominations
The Dove won the 1929 Academy Award for Best Art Direction for William Cameron Menzies.

See also
 The Girl and the Gambler (1939)

References

External links

Alternative lobby advertisement
Still at olgabaclanova.com

1927 films
American black-and-white films
American silent feature films
American films based on plays
Films whose art director won the Best Art Direction Academy Award
Films directed by Roland West
American romantic drama films
1927 romantic drama films
1920s American films
Silent romantic drama films
Silent American drama films